Politz or Pölitz may refer to:

 Politz an der Elbe, a town in North Bohemia, now a district of Děčín, Czech Republic
 Politz an der Mettau, a city in north Bohemia, Czech Republic
 Politz Day School of Cherry Hill, a private Jewish school in Cherry Hill, New Jersey
 Pölitz, a municipality  in Schleswig-Holstein, Germany
 Police, West Pomeranian Voivodeship (German: Pölitz), a town in northwestern Poland

See also 
 Police (disambiguation)
 Pollitz
 Politzer, a surname
 Pollitzer, a surname